Romantics Anonymous is a musical with music by Michael Kooman, lyrics by Christopher Dimond and book by Emma Rice. It is based on the 2010 French-Belgian film Les Émotifs Anonymes by Jean-Pierre Améris and Philippe Blasband.

Productions

London (2017-18) 
The musical premiered at the Sam Wanamaker Playhouse in London from 20 October 2017 running until 6 January 2018. The production was directed by Rice (who at the time was Artistic Director of Shakespeare's Globe), designed by Lez Brotherston and choreographed by Etta Murfitt.

The production received positive reviews earning four and five stars from The Stage, WhatsOnStage.com, BroadwayWorld and Musical Theatre Review.

Bristol and COVID-19 live stream (2020) 
The musical ran at the Bristol Old Vic from 18 January to 1 February 2020, produced by Emma Rice's theatre company Wise Children and Push Theatricals with Rice returning as director and Carly Bawden reprising her role as Angélique with Marc Antolin returning as Jean-René (having previously playing Ludo / Remi). Following the Bristol run, the musical was scheduled to embark on an international tour, however due to the COVID-19 pandemic all dates were cancelled including dates at the Shakespeare Theatre Company in Washington, D.C. (17 to 29 March), the Wallis Annenberg Center for the Performing Arts in Beverly Hills (7 April to 17 May 2020), and Spoleto Festival USA in Charleston, SC (21 May to 7 June).

The musical was broadcast live from the Bristol Old Vic stage (featuring the majority of the cast from the January 2020 run) from 22 to 26 September 2020, being presented as a "digital tour", meaning that tickets were sold through partner theatres across the UK and US and each region would be available to book on a specific night. The company was tested for coronavirus before forming a bubble, meaning the show could be rehearsed and performed without social distancing.

Cast and characters

Critical reception 
The musical received positive reviews when it opened in London with five star reviews from BroadwayWorld and Musical Theatre Review and four star reviews from WhatsOnStage.com, The Stage, Financial Times, The Independent, Time Out London, London Times and The Guardian.

External links 

 Official website
 Wise Children website

References 

2017 musicals
British musicals
Musicals based on films